Tsai Chih-hsiu (born 25 October 1976) is a Taiwanese boxer. He competed in the men's light flyweight event at the 1996 Summer Olympics.

References

1976 births
Living people
Taiwanese male boxers
Olympic boxers of Taiwan
Boxers at the 1996 Summer Olympics
Place of birth missing (living people)
Light-flyweight boxers
20th-century Taiwanese people